Kazuhiro Mori may refer to:

 Kazuhiro Mori (footballer) (born 1981), Japanese football player
 Kazuhiro Mori (cyclist) (born 1982), Japanese cyclist